An Ultimatum is a demand whose fulfillment is backed up by a threat.

Ultimatum may also refer to:

Comics
Ultimatum (comics), A Marvel Comics crossover event for 2008 within the Ultimate Marvel imprint
ULTIMATUM, a fictional terrorist organization, see Features of the Marvel Universe#Criminal organizations
Ultimatum, an alternative version of Marvel Comics character Miles Morales
"Ultimatum", an episode of the animated series Justice League Unlimited
Ultimatum, an Image Comics character who appeared in Savage Dragon and Freak Force and was a member of Vicious Circle

Music
Ultimatum (EP), a 2005 EP by The Long Winters 
Ultimatum (Nightstick album)
Ultimatum (Australian band), an Australian hardcore band
Ultimatum (American band), an American heavy metal band
"Ultimatum", a song by Shaggy from his 2005 album Clothes Drop
"Ultimatum", a song by Ten Foot Pole
"Ultimatum", an album by music composer Jesper Kyd for Motion Picture Advertising
"Ultimatum", a song by Disclosure featuring Fatoumata Diawara

Film and television
Ultimatum (game show), a Quebec quiz show
The Bourne Ultimatum (film), a 2007 film starring Matt Damon as Jason Bourne
"Ultimatum" (The Office), an episode of The Office
The Ultimatum, a Singaporean Chinese TV drama 
The Ultimatum: Marry or Move On, a dating reality television show on Netflix
Eternal Theater, a 2010 film formerly titled Ultimatum
Ultimatum (1938 film), a 1938 film directed by Robert Wiene 
Ultimatum (1994 film), a 1994 film directed by Cirio H. Santiago
Ultimatum (2001 film), a 2001 film directed by Yuen Wah 
Ultimatum (2009 film), a 2009 film directed by Alain Tasma
"Ultimatum", the forty-first episode of Code Lyoko
"The Ultimatum", the thirty-seventh episode of Avatar: The Legend of Korra

Other
Ultimatum game, an experimental economics game in which two parties interact anonymously and only once, so reciprocation is not an issue
Ultimatum, a 1973 novel by Richard Rohmer
Ultimatum (book), a 2009 book by Matthew Glass
HMS Ultimatum (P34), a Royal Navy U-class submarine